The Associazione Friulana di Astronomia e Meteorologia (AFAM, eng. Friulian Association of Astronomy and Meteorology) is a non-profit cultural association whose goal is the promotion of astronomy and meteorology to the public and the development of scientific research activities, often in collaboration with professional scientists.

Established in 1969, now AFAM has its own operating structures in Remanzacco (Friuli, Italy). 

AFAM is member of the Unione Astrofili Italiani (the Italian union of amateur astronomers).

The Association has an own library, a conference room, a permanent Astronomical Observatory with optical instruments for visual observation and CCD sensors for research.

Members

 Luca Donato, president
 Giovanni Sostero

See also
 List of astronomical societies

References

External links
 Official site of the Associazione Friulana di Astronomia e Meteorologia

Astronomy organizations
1969 establishments in Italy
Scientific organizations established in 1969
Astronomy in Italy